Woodlawn Avenue Row is a set of historic rowhouses located at Buffalo in Erie County, New York.  It is one of a rare surviving group of speculative multi-unit frame residences designed to resemble rowhouses in the city of Buffalo.  The set of four frame, two story rowhouses were built in 1898.

It was listed on the National Register of Historic Places in 1986.

References

External links
Woodlawn Avenue Row - U.S. National Register of Historic Places on Waymarking.com

Residential buildings on the National Register of Historic Places in New York (state)
Queen Anne architecture in New York (state)
Houses completed in 1898
Houses in Buffalo, New York
Architecture of Buffalo, New York
National Register of Historic Places in Buffalo, New York